James W. Kindig (December 3, 1879 – May 12, 1950) was a justice of the Iowa Supreme Court from April 30, 1927, to December 31, 1934, appointed from Woodbury County, Iowa.

References

Justices of the Iowa Supreme Court
1879 births
1950 deaths
Place of birth missing
Place of death missing